The Mooney M-18 "Mite" is a low-wing, single-place monoplane with retractable, tricycle landing gear.

The Mite was designed by Al Mooney and was intended as a personal airplane marketed to fighter pilots returning from World War II.

Development
The M-18 design goal was extremely low operating costs. The Mite is constructed mainly of fabric-covered wood, with a single spruce and plywood "D" wing spar. The wing aft of the spar is fabric-covered.

The airfoil selected for the design was the NACA 64A215. The M-18 represented the first time a NACA 6-series airfoil had been used on a civil aircraft after World War II.

The aircraft featured a unique "safe-trim" system. This mechanical device links the wing flaps to the tail trim system and automatically adjusts the horizontal stabilizer angle when the flaps are deflected, reducing or eliminating pitch changes when the flaps are lowered.

Production
The Mooney Aircraft Corporation built a total of 283 Mites in Wichita, Kansas, and Kerrville, Texas, between 1947 and 1954. The first seven were powered by belt driven, modified  Crosley automobile engines, but these proved to be troublesome. Production shifted to the M-18L powered by the four-cylinder,  Lycoming O-145 powerplant. The original Crosley-powered Mites were recalled and retrofitted with the Lycoming engines at no charge. The later M-18C used the Continental A65  aircraft engine.

The market for the single-seat M-18 was limited, so Mooney later developed the four-place M-20 to appeal to aircraft owners with families. In the early 1970s,  Mooney offered plans for four different home-built versions of the M-18.

Factory production of the Mite ended in 1954. Leading up to this, the company was losing $1000 on each plane, which accelerated the development of the M20. Another factor was that Continental had ceased production of the engine used in the Mite due to a lack of demand.

Operational history
As of January 2016, 119 Mites were still registered in the United States and three in Canada.

Specifications (Mooney Mite M-18C)

References

Bibliography
 
 

Homebuilt aircraft
Low-wing aircraft
Mite
Single-engined tractor aircraft
1940s United States civil utility aircraft
Aircraft first flown in 1947